Xifeng is a county with 250,000 inhabitants under the administration of Guiyang, the capital of Guizhou Province, People's Republic of China.
The seat of the county is Yongjing. It is home to many forests, hotsprings, and other tourist attractions.

Sights
Xifeng concentration camp, now a memorial to those imprisoned and killed by the Kuomintang there between 1937-1948.
Wujiang Gorge

Transportation 
China National Highway 210

Climate

References

External links
  Introductions of Xifeng by xinhuanet 1 , 2, 3
Guiyang official website

County-level divisions of Guizhou